Hajjiabad (also Romanized as Ḩājjīābād; also known as ’ājjīābād) is a village in Garizat Rural District, Nir District, Taft County, Yazd Province, Iran. At the 2006 census, its population was 45, in 12 families.

References 

Populated places in Taft County